Adarna may refer to:

People with the surname
Ellen Adarna (born 1988), Filipino actress

Other uses
Adarna (TV series), a Filipino TV series
Adarna House, a Filipino book publishing company
The Adarna, an American rock band from Seattle, Washington

See also
Ibong Adarna (mythology), a legendary bird of the Philippines